Stuart Colin Matthewman (born 18 August 1960), also known as Cottonbelly, is an English songwriter, record producer and musician. With Sade Adu, Paul S. Denman, and Andrew Hale, he gained worldwide fame as the guitarist/saxophonist of the band Sade. Stuart is also a member of Sweetback, and was one half of Twin Danger.

Early life and career
Matthewman was born on 18 August 1960 in Hull, East Riding of Yorkshire. In 1982, he relocated to London. 

Joining Latin funk band Pride, Matthewman met singer Sade Adu and they began writing songs together. Teaming with bassist Paul S. Denman and keyboardist Andrew Hale, they formed the band Sade. Sade signed with Epic Records U.K. division in 1984. In addition to songwriting, Matthewman can be heard on saxophone, guitar, keyboards, and programming. He appeared on all of Sade's tours and albums: Diamond Life, Promise, Stronger Than Pride, Love Deluxe, Lovers Rock, and Soldier of Love all of which went triple platinum in the U.S. and have totalled sales over 40 million albums worldwide.

In 1995, percussionist Karl Vanden Bossche introduced Matthewman to then unknown singer Maxwell. Matthewman co-produced, co-wrote, and played saxophone and guitar on Maxwell's albums: Maxwell's Urban Hang Suite (Columbia, 1996), Embrya (Columbia, 1998), Now (Columbia, 2001) and blackSUMMERS'night (Columbia, 2016).

In 1996 Matthewman along with Andrew Hale and Paul Spencer Denman formed the studio band Sweetback. Their work featured instrumental songs and songs with guest vocalists. They released two albums, Sweetback (1996) and Stage 2 (2004).

Matthewman co-wrote, performed, and produced tracks on Santessa's 2000 trip-hop album Delirium released on Sony.

Using the pseudonym Cottonbelly, Stuart released the dub/electronic album, X Amounts of Niceness in 2010  and produced remixes for artists.

Working with Paloma Faith on her third studio album, Stuart Matthewman co-wrote two songs on her album A Perfect Contradiction released March 2014.  In an interview with Pete Lewis for Blues and Soul print magazine, issue 1098, Paloma Faith discusses working with songwriters:   "another person I really clicked with was Stuart Matthewman, who is Sade's co-writer. Basically I found him very easy to work with because to me he is really like a beautiful facilitator. In that I could just hum something to him and, though it could seem like a really shoddy idea, he would somehow immediately just play the right chords that would make it sound like something really special. So yeah, I think working with Stuart was actually one of the best co-writing experiences I've ever HAD - just because he works in very simple ways".

Stuart was also a member of the group Twin Danger, formed in 2011 with singer/writer Vanessa Bley, daughter of late jazz pianist Paul Bley and pioneer video artist Carol Goss. In 2014 Twin Danger signed to Decca Classics/Universal records and released their eponymously titled album in spring 2015. Vanessa Bley was killed in a car crash on 25 October 2019 in California.

In 1996 Matthewman composed the music the short movie 'Bajo del Perro' by LA based film makers Mike Polish and Mark Polish.  He went on to compose the music scores for various films; with Maxwell the music for the short film To Be A Black Man (1997), and Twin Falls Idaho (1999), Jackpot (2001), Northfork (2003), The Double (2005), The Astronaut Farmer (2006), Life Support (2007), The Smell Of Success (2009), Nona(2017), and short Erotic Dreams of the Chelsea Hotel (2017).

Matthewman has discussed diverse musical influences including Junior Walker, King Curtis, Art Pepper, Ernie Isley, Steve Jones, Wah Wah Watson, Issac Hayes, Bill Withers, Lee Perry, Tony Iommi and Gustav Mahler.

Personal life
Married to Michele Matthewman (1990–2018), they had a son, Clay Matthewman. Stuart is an avid cyclist, and races with New York race team RBNY.

Discography

References

External links
Cottonbelly website

Interview with Stuart Matthewman, 27 July 2011
Stuart Matthewman Career Retrospective Interview from August 2015 with Pods & Sods

Living people
1960 births
Brit Award winners
English funk musicians
English songwriters
Grammy Award winners
Musicians from Kingston upon Hull
Sade (band) members
Sophisti-pop musicians
Acid jazz musicians
Chill-out musicians
Downtempo musicians